Salih I ibn Mansur (ca. 710), was the founder of the Kingdom of Nekor, located in the Rif Mountains of Morocco. It is widely accepted that he was a Himyarite immigrant from Yemen. His dynasty was responsible for converting the local Berber tribes to Islam. Initially the local tribes resisted the restrictions of the new religion and soon deposed their ruler but he was later asked to return and assume power again. His dynasty, the Banu Salih, ruled the region until 1019.

References 

8th-century monarchs in Africa
People from Nekor
8th-century Arabs
Yemeni people